"Say You're Mine Again" is a song written by Charles Nathan and Dave Heisler and performed by Perry Como featuring The Ramblers.  It reached number 3 on the U.S. pop chart in 1953.

The song ranked at number 21 on Billboard's Year-End top 30 singles of 1953.

Other charting versions
June Hutton and Axel Stordahl released a version of the song which reached number 6 on the UK Singles Chart and number 21 on the U.S. pop chart in 1953.

Other versions
Dolores Gray released a version of the song as the B-side to her 1953 single "Big Mamou".
Eddy Howard and His Orchestra released a version of the song as a single in 1953, but it did not chart.
The Modernaires featuring the Fran Scott Orchestra released a version of the song as a single in 1953, but it did not chart.
Vic Dana released a version of the song on his 1965 album, Moonlight and Roses.
Ronnie Dio & The Prophets released a version of the song as a single in 1965, but it did not chart.

References

1953 songs
1953 singles
1965 singles
Perry Como songs
Eddy Howard songs
RCA Victor singles
Capitol Records singles
Mercury Records singles
Coral Records singles